Donal na Pipi MacCarthy Reagh (Irish: Domhnall na bpíopaí Mac Cárthaigh Riabhach) (died 10 October 1612) was the 17th Prince of Carbery from 1593 to 1606, when he surrendered the principality to the English Crown under the policy of Surrender and Regrant.

He belonged to the MacCarthy Reagh dynasty as a son of Cormac na Haoine, the 13th Prince of Carbery. His epithet "of the Pipes" (na bpíopaí in Irish) originates from when several pipes of wine washed up on the beach at Burren, which was traditionally believed to be a sign of good fortune for him.

Birth and origins 
Donal was born the eldest son of Cormac MacCarthy Reagh and his wife Julia MacCarthy. His father was the 13th Prince of Carbery. His father's family were the MacCarthy Reagh, a Gaelic Irish dynasty that branched from the MacCarthy-Mor line with Donal Gott MacCarthy, a medieval King of Desmond, whose sixth son Donal Maol MacCarthy Reagh was the first independent ruler of Carbery.

His mother was a daughter of Cormac Oge Laidir MacCarthy, 10th Lord of Muskerry. She had married his father after the death of her first husband, Gerald Fitzmaurice, 15th Baron Kerry. Her father's family were the MacCarthys of Muskerry, another cadet branch of the MacCarthy Mor.

Marriage and children 
Donal married Margaret, daughter of Sir Thomas Ruadh FitzGerald and Ellice Power. She was a granddaughter of James FitzGerald, 13th Earl of Desmond. Ellice Power was a daughter of Sir Richard Poer, 1st Baron le Power and Coroghmore, and Catherine Butler, daughter of Piers Butler, 8th Earl of Ormond.

 
Donal and Margaret had six sons:
Cormac, who predeceased his father but had a son Donal who married Ellen Roche, daughter of David Roche, 7th Viscount Fermoy
Florence of Banduff
Donogh of Kilbrittain, died without issue
Owen, from whom descended the Springhouse branch, which would produce the Counts MacCarthy Reagh of Toulouse
Taig, died without issue
Donal, died without issue

—and two daughters:
Julia, married Edmond, Lord Barry as his 2nd wife
Ellen, married Taig MacCarthy of Ballykay

17th Prince 
According to English custom he would have succeeded his father as Prince of Carbery at his death in 1567, but brehon law was applied and all his three paternal uncles ruled before him. He succeeded as the 17th Prince of Carbery at the death of his uncle Owen in about 1593.

Surrender and regrant 
Although he surrendered Carbery to the Crown in 1606, he does not appear to have been granted a peerage in return as would typically have been the case. However, as seen in the 1607 pedigree, he is listed being "Lord of Carbery" and as such the family was able to retain a vast yearly income. Donal na Pipi's son, Cormac, predeceased him leaving an only son, Donal of Kilbrittain, who died in 1636. Upon his death an inquisition was taken of the family and it was determined that the MacCarthy Reagh was still collecting yearly rents from various Irish chiefs that all totaled £207 16s 11¼d per annum. This sum doesn't include any revenue from his 70½ demesne ploughlands, and is approximately equivalent to £1,056,000 in 2018.

Conflict with Florence 
Donal na Pipi is widely known due to his conflict with his cousin, Florence, over the succession to the chiefship as Prince of Carbery. Donal notoriously broke a promise to Florence when he violated his bond with Florence for £10,000 and surrendered the territory and lordship of Carbery to King James I in 1606. Although it can only be speculated, it seems Donal may have realized that English conquest was by now a sure thing, and the best way (despite his personal ambitions) to preserve Carbery was to opt for surrender and regrant. The family's native Irish allegiance can hardly be called into question, as just fours years earlier, although Donal na Pipi remained visibly neutral, his cousin fought alongside The O'Sullivan Beare against the English at the Battle of Kinsale.

Carbery 
By comparing William F.T. Butler's map, 'The Barony of Carbery in Tudor Times,' with modern land surveys, we can estimate that at the time Donal surrendered Carbery, it comprised the modern baronies of West Carbery (East and West Divisions), East Carbery (East and West Divisions), Kinalmeaky, and Ibane and Barryroe. Which would equate to 436,478.1 acres (682 square miles) in size, or just over 2% of Ireland's total size. In medieval Ireland (prior to its incorporation as a petty kingdom) it was the largest barony, and that superlative would remain true today. In fact, if it were reestablished today as its own kingdom it would rank a respectable 180th out of the world's recognized 225 countries and dependencies by land area.

Ancestry

Notes and references

Notes

Citations

Sources 

 
  – to 1603
 
 
 
  – Irish stem

1612 deaths
Irish princes
MacCarthy dynasty
Year of birth missing